The following is a list of Grammy Awards winners and nominees from South Africa:

Notes

References

South African
 Grammy
Grammy
Grammy